Cornelia Jane Jordan ( Matthews; January 11, 1830 – January 26, 1898) was an American poet and lyricist associated with the Civil War. Her book of poems entitled Corinth, and other Poems, published after the surrender, was seized by the military commander of Richmond, Virginia and suppressed. She published a volume entitled Richmond, Her Glory and Her Graves. Jordan also contributed many articles to magazines and newspapers, the best of which were "The Battle of Manassas," "The Death of Jackson" and "An Appeal for Jefferson Davis". She was a member of the Alumni of the Convent of the Visitation, Georgetown, Washington, D.C., her alma mater.

Early life and education
Cornelia Jane Matthews was born in Lynchburg, Virginia, January 11, 1830. Her father was Edwin Matthews, a former mayor of that town. Her mother was Emily Goggin Matthews, a sister of William L. Goggin, who figured prominently in Virginia politics before the war. She was born to wealth, and received all the advantages of liberal education and polished society. After her mother's death in 1834, Jordan and two younger sisters were sent to the home of their grandmother in Bedford County.

In 1842, at the age of 12, Jordan was placed in the school of the Sisters of the Visitation, in Georgetown. Her poetical productions being numerous and excellent, she was the poet-laureate of her schoolmates.

Career
In 1851, she married Francis Hubert Jordan (1821–1896), a lawyer from Luray, Virginia, where she made her home. During the first years of her married life, she wrote a great deal. A collection of her poems was published in Richmond, in 1860, with the title, Flowers of Hope and Memory. During the Civil War, she wrote many stirring lyrics. A volume of these, entitled Corinth, and Other Poems, was published after the surrender. It was seized by the military commander in Richmond and suppressed as seditious. 

In 1867, she published Richmond: Her Glory and Her Graves, in a volume with some shorter lyrics. She contributed many poems to magazines and newspapers. Her best-known war poems were  "The Battle of Manassas", "The Death of Jackson", and "An Appeal for Jefferson Davis". Her "Funeral Flowers" touched a sympathetic chord, while "Old Confed'" was copied into various Southern journals.

Cornelia Jane Jordan died in 1898, aged 68.

Selected works
 Flowers of Hope and Memory, 1860
 "Of such is the Kingdom of Heaven" : the blighted bud, a mother's record of a little life soon ended., 1861
 Corinth, and other poems of the war, 1865
 Richmond: Her Glory and Her Graves, 1867
 Echoes from the cannon, 1899

References

Attribution

Bibliography

External links
 
 

1830 births
1898 deaths
19th-century American poets
19th-century American women writers
Writers from Lynchburg, Virginia
Poets from Virginia
American women poets
Women in the American Civil War
People from Luray, Virginia
Wikipedia articles incorporating text from A Woman of the Century